Fornham may refer to the following places in Suffolk, England:

 Fornham All Saints
 Fornham St Genevieve
 Fornham St Martin